Erik Jirka (born 19 September 1997) is a Slovak professional footballer who plays as a winger for Czech club Viktoria Plzeň and the Slovakia national team.

Club career
Jirka was a FC Spartak Trnava youth graduate. He made his league debut for Trnava on 8 November 2014 against Ružomberok.

In September 2018, Jirka signed a four–year contract with Red Star Belgrade, effective from January 2019. However, in summer 2019, in order to get more playing time, he headed to vice-champions from Radnički Niš for a half-season loan.
In January 2020 he was sent on another half-season loan, this time to Polish team Górnik Zabrze.

In August 2020, Jirka was sent on a loan for a third time since arriving at Red Star, this time to the Spanish side CD Mirandés for the entire 2020–21 season with an option to buy at the end of a season. On 17 July 2021, Jirka signed with Real Oviedo a two-year contract with a further year dependent on the completion of objectives .

International career
Jirka was a regular in the Slovakia U19 and Slovakia U21 national teams.

He received his first call-up to the main senior national team for a friendly game on 18 November 2020, against Czechia, however, he failed to debut on that occasion. He made his debut on 1 June 2021 in a friendly against Bulgaria.

In March 2022, Jirka was additionally called up as an alternate to Ivan Schranz for two friendly fixtures against Norway and Finland. In the first match against Norway, on 25 March, Jirka came in as a late second-half replacement for Lukáš Haraslín in the 2-0 defeat. However, on 29 March 2022, in a match against Finland played on a neutral pitch at Estadio Nueva Condomina in Murcia, Jirka scored his first international goal. In the first half, Slovaks took the lead through Ondrej Duda. In the second half, in the 72nd minute, Jirka scored with a left-footed shot from outside the penalty box past Lukáš Hrádecký following a pass by Róbert Boženík and sealing the 2-0 victory. He remained on the pitch for the entirety of the match.

International goals

Honours
Spartak Trnava
 Fortuna Liga: 2017–18

Red Star Belgrade
 Serbian SuperLiga: 2018–19

References

External links
 
 Futbalnet profile
 

1997 births
Living people
Sportspeople from Trnava
Association football wingers
Slovak footballers
Slovakia youth international footballers
Slovakia under-21 international footballers
Slovakia international footballers
Slovak expatriate footballers
FC Spartak Trnava players
Red Star Belgrade footballers
FK Radnički Niš players
Górnik Zabrze players
CD Mirandés footballers
Real Oviedo players
FC Viktoria Plzeň players
Slovak Super Liga players
Serbian SuperLiga players
Ekstraklasa players
Segunda División players
Czech First League players
Slovak expatriate sportspeople in Serbia
Slovak expatriate sportspeople in Poland
Slovak expatriate sportspeople in Spain
Slovak expatriate sportspeople in the Czech Republic
Expatriate footballers in Serbia
Expatriate footballers in Poland
Expatriate footballers in Spain
Expatriate footballers in the Czech Republic